Viviane Bahia (born 14 February 1994) is a female water polo player of Brazil.

She was part of the Brazilian team at the  2015 World Aquatics Championships.
She participated in the 2016 Summer Olympics.

See also
 Brazil at the 2015 World Aquatics Championships

References

External links

Viviane Bahia - Women's Water Polo
Viviane Bahia Photostream

Brazilian female water polo players
Living people
Place of birth missing (living people)
1994 births
Olympic water polo players of Brazil
Water polo players at the 2016 Summer Olympics
Pan American Games medalists in water polo
Pan American Games bronze medalists for Brazil
Water polo players at the 2015 Pan American Games
Water polo players at the 2019 Pan American Games
Medalists at the 2015 Pan American Games
Medalists at the 2019 Pan American Games
21st-century Brazilian women